Granbury is a city in and the county seat of Hood County, Texas, United States.  As of the 2020 census, the city's population was 10,958, and it is the principal city of the Granbury micropolitan statistical area. Granbury is named after Confederate General Hiram B. Granbury.

Granbury started as a square and log cabin courthouse. Many buildings on the square are now registered historic landmarks, including the Granbury Opera House, which still hosts "Broadway" productions. The city's name originated from Confederate General Hiram B. Granberry. To explain why the city name is spelled differently, some scholars believe the name Granberry was misread on a document. Recent findings conclude that Granberry chose to spell his name Granbury.[2]

A recent expansion of the city was made possible by building a Brazos River dam in 1969, which formed Lake Granbury, a long, narrow lake that flows through the city.

History 

The Fort Worth and Rio Grande Railway, building towards Brownwood from Fort Worth, reached Granbury in 1887.  In the 20th century, the line was owned successively by the Frisco Railway, the Santa Fe Railway, and the South Orient Railroad before being acquired by the Fort Worth and Western Railroad in 1999.

On May 15, 2013, a tornado with a preliminary rating of EF4 struck Granbury, leaving six confirmed deaths and at least 100 homes damaged. Approximately 48 injured people were treated at Lake Granbury Medical Center. The tornado was a part of the Tornado outbreak of May 15–17, 2013 in Texas and Oklahoma.

Geography
Granbury is located along US Route 377 approximately 30 miles southwest of Fort Worth. The Brazos River flows past the east side of the city within Lake Granbury.

Climate
The climate in this area is characterized by hot, humid summers and generally mild to cool winters.  According to the Köppen climate classification, Granbury has a humid subtropical climate, Cfa on climate maps.

Demographics

2020 census

As of the 2020 United States census, there were 10,958 people, 4,602 households, and 2,813 families residing in the city.

2010 census
As of the census of 2010,  7,978 people, 3,559 households, and 1,927 families were residing in the city. The population density was 619.1 people/sq mi (239.0/km2). The 4,419 housing units averaged 342.9/sq mi (132.4/km2). The city's racial makeup was 93.75% White, 0.71% African American, 0.71% Native American, 1.14% Asian or Pacific Islander, 2.11% from other races, and 1.58% from two or more races. Hispanics or Latinos of any race were 8.57% of the population.

Of the 3,559 households,  27.0% had children under 18 living with them, 48.4% were married couples, 9.5% had a female householder with no husband present, and 39.0% were not families. About 34.9% of all households were made up of individuals, and 18.7% had someone who was 65 or older living alone. The average household size was 2.20, and the average family size was 2.83.
In the city, the age distribution was 21.0% under 18, 8.0% from 18 to 24, 25.6% from 25 to 44, 21.9% from 45 to 64, and 23.4% 65  or older. The median age was 42 years. For every 100 females, there were 83.4 males. For every 100 females ages 18 and over, there were 77.1 males.

The median income for a household in the city was $35,952, and for a family was $45,451. Males had a median income of $34,625 versus $25,721 for females. The per capita income for the city was $19,801. About 5.0% of families and 9.6% of the population were below the poverty line, including 4.6% of those under age 18 and 14.9% of those ages 65 or over.

Education

The Granbury Independent School District consists of 21 campuses. They include Granbury High School, STARS Academy, Behavior Transition Center, Granbury Middle School, Acton Middle School, Mambrino STEAM Academy, Brawner Intermediate, Oak Woods Elementary, Acton Elementary, Nettie Baccus Elementary, and Emma Roberson Elementary. Granbury has been a 5A district since 2008. Also, a Happy Hill Farm Academy home is in the district. In 1999, boys' soccer won the 4A state championship in Texas.

Media
Granbury and Hood County are part of the Dallas/Fort Worth television media market in North Central Texas. Local news media outlets are KDFW-TV, KXAS-TV, WFAA-TV, KTVT-TV, KERA-TV, KTXA-TV, KDFI-TV, KDAF-TV, KFWD-TV, and KDTX-TV. Granbury is also served by a local Public Education and Government Access Channel Granbury TV. Two news media sources serve Hood County, Hood County Free Press, an online daily news publication, and the biweekly newspaper Hood County News. Granbury is also served by Tarleton State University's National Public Radio affiliate, KTRL 90.5 FM.

Infrastructure
Granbury is served by Granbury Regional Airport (GDJ). The neighborhood of Pecan Plantation has a municipal airport that operates only recreational flights.

Notable people

 Leta Andrews, the high school basketball coach with the most wins in the country
 Brian Birdwell, Texas State Senator, assumed this office in June 2010
 Cynthia Brants, artist and member of the Fort Worth Circle
 Bill Garrett, former PGA Tour golfer
 Peter Mayhew, British actor who played Chewbacca in the Star Wars films; formerly lived in Granbury
 Andy Parker, drummer for the English rock group UFO; resides in Granbury
 Jia Perkins, San Antonio Silver Stars basketball player
 Johnny Perkins, New York Giants professional football player; attended Granbury High School
 Nellie Gray Robertson, first female county attorney in Texas; born in Granbury and elected Hood County attorney in 1918
 Dave Smith, former Oklahoma State Cowboys and SMU Mustangs head coach
 Dana Vollmer, Olympic gold medal-winning swimmer
 Robert Williamson III, poker player, grew up in Granbury and graduated from Granbury High School

References

External links

 

Cities in Hood County, Texas
Cities in Texas
County seats in Texas
Granbury micropolitan area
Populated places established in 1860
2013 in Texas
1860 establishments in Texas